Braniewo (Old Prussian: Brus), is a town in northern Poland, in Warmia, in the Warmian-Masurian Voivodeship, with a population of 16,907 as of June 2021. It is the capital of Braniewo County.

Braniewo is the second biggest city of Warmia after Olsztyn and one of the historical centers of the region.

Location 
The Polish border with Russia's Kaliningrad Oblast lies 6 km north, and may be reached from Braniewo via National road 54.

History

Middle Ages

According to the German geographer Johann Friedrich Goldbeck (1748-1812), the town originally was named Brunsberg after Bruno von Schauenburg (1205–1281), bishop of Olomouc in Moravia, who accompanied King Ottokar II of Bohemia in 1254 and 1267 when the latter participated in the crusade of the Teutonic Knights against the Old Prussians. It has also been suggested that the name Braunsberg might stem from Brusebergue ("camp of the Prussians"), but this notion is not documented.

In 1243, the settlement and the surrounding region of Warmia was given by the Teutonic Order to the newly created Bishopric of Warmia, whose bishop built his cathedral in the town and made it his chief residence. The city was granted town privileges based on those of Lübeck in 1254, but in 1261 was destroyed and depopulated during the second of the Prussian Uprisings. It was rebuilt in a new location in 1273 and settled by colonists from Lübeck. In 1284, it was given a new town charter, again based on that of Lübeck. However, the next bishop, Heinrich Fleming (1278–1300), transferred the chapter from Braunsberg to Frauenburg (now Frombork).

In 1296, a Franciscan abbey was built, and in 1342, a "new town" was added. As the most important trading and harbor city in Warmia, the town prospered as member of the Hanseatic League, which it remained until 1608. 
In 1440, the town was one of the founding members of the Prussian Confederation, which opposed Teutonic rule, and upon the request of which King Casimir IV Jagiellon incorporated the territory to the Kingdom of Poland in 1454. The town pledged allegiance to the Polish King and recognized his rule in March 1454 in Kraków. After the subsequent Thirteen Years' War, the Teutonic Knights renounced any claims to the town in the Second Peace of Thorn in 1466. Administratively, it was part of the Prince-Bishopric of Warmia in the new autonomous province of Royal Prussia, later on also in the Greater Poland Province.

Modern era
After the secularization of the Teutonic Order in 1525, a large part of its residents converted to Lutheran Protestantism. Duke Albert, who had been grand master of the Order, sought to unite Warmia with Ducal Prussia (a nearby vassal state of Poland), causing the Catholics of the town to swear allegiance to the king of Poland in return for aid against Protestant Prussia. In 1526 a Polish royal commission released Braunsberg burghers from the oath to the Polish king and handed the town back to Prince-Bishop Mauritius Ferber. However, just like the entire area of Warmia, Braunsberg swore allegiance to the Prince-Bishops of Warmia, who were subjects of the popes.  Additionally, it had to denounce all Lutheran teachings and hand over Lutheran writings. Thereafter Warmia remained predominantly Roman Catholic (even after the Partitions of Poland, when it became part of Prussia in 1772).

Braniewo was occupied by Sweden for about three years during the Livonian War in the 16th century. In Warmia, Lutheran teachings again were suppressed when Prince-Bishop Stanislaus Hosius (1504-1579) brought in the Jesuits and founded the Collegium Hosianum school. Among the students of the school were Polish Catholic Saint Andrew Bobola, Polish statesmen and high dignitaries Mikołaj Zebrzydowski and Piotr Gembicki, Europe's most prominent 17th-century Latin poet Maciej Kazimierz Sarbiewski, missionary, explorer, mathematician, astronomer and sinologist Jan Mikołaj Smogulecki, and Primate of Poland Gabriel Podoski. Prominent Hungarian Renaissance poet Bálint Balassi stayed in the town in 1590–1591. A priestly seminary was added in 1564. Pope Gregory XIII later added a papal mission seminary for northern and eastern European countries. Regina Protmann (1552-1613), a native of Braunsberg (Braniewo), founded the Saint Catherine Order of Sisters in the town, recognized by the church in 1583. The Jesuit theologian Antonius Possevinus was instrumental in enlarging the Collegium Hosianum in the 1580s to counter the growing Protestant movement.

The Polish, and mainly Catholic town was annexed by the mostly Protestant Kingdom of Prussia in 1772 during the First Partition of Poland and made part of the newly formed province of East Prussia the following year.

19th and 20th centuries

Braunsberg obtained its first railway connection with the rest of the kingdom via the Prussian Eastern Railway in 1852. In the early 20th century, the town was the leading academic center of East Prussia next to Königsberg. In 1912 the Jesuit college became the State Academy of Braunsberg (German: Staatliche Akademie Braunsberg). Prior to World War II, the population of Braunsberg had grown to more than 21,000, of whom 59 percent were listed as Catholic and 29 percent Protestant.

The Second World War turned much of the town into ruins. After three and a half years of savage warfare, Soviet forces began their assault on German land by attacking East Prussia on Jan. 13, 1945. Red Army formations reached the Vistula Lagoon north of Braunsberg on Jan. 26. In early February, German civilians began fleeing from Braunsberg across the ice of the frozen lagoon to the Vistula Spit, from which many journeyed to either Danzig (Gdańsk) or Pillau (Baltiysk), and managed to board German ships that made the perilous voyage westward. Braunsberg was captured by Soviet troops on March 20, 1945. 

Heavy fighting and wanton destruction afterwards had left the town about 80 percent destroyed, including much of its historic town center, largely consumed by fire. Under the Soviet Union's re-drawing of borders within the Potsdam Agreement, the town became again part of Poland, and was partially repopulated by Polish settlers, many of whom came from areas of eastern Poland annexed by the Soviet Union.

In 2001 the St. Catherine Church, built in 1346, destroyed in 1945, and rebuilt after 1979, was declared a Basilica Minor. This Gothic Hall church was built on a site which had held a previous wooden Church of St. Catherine since 1280. Prince-Bishop Lucas Watzenrode of Warmia (1447–1512) had added extensively to the original building.

Number of inhabitants by year

Political timeline
1240 first mentioned as part of the monastic state of the Teutonic Knights
1254 Lübeck law rights granted
1454 incorporation to the Kingdom of Poland, upon the request of the Prussian Confederation
1466 Second Peace of Thorn (1466): recognized as part of Poland, administratively part of the Prince-Bishopric of Warmia in the province of Royal Prussia, after 1569 in the province of Greater Poland
1772 First Partition of Poland: became part of the Kingdom of Prussia
1871 German Empire founded: the town automatically part of it
1945 Occupation by Soviet Red Army, then became again part of Poland.

Economy
The Browar Braniewo ("Braniewo Brewery") is located in the town.

Sports

Notable residents

 Stanislaus Hosius (1504–1579), Polish Catholic cardinal, prince-bishop, founder of the Collegium Hosianum
 Regina Protmann (1522–1613), Polish Catholic nun, charity pioneer.
 Andrew Bobola (1591–1657), Polish missionary, martyr and Catholic saint.
 August Willich (1810–1878), German politician and general.
 Karl Weierstrass (1815–1897), German mathematician.
 Gustavus von Tempsky (1828–1868), German newspaper correspondent and soldier.
 Elimar Klebs (1852–1918), German historian
 Samuel Oppenheim (1857–1928), Austrian astronomer.
 Konrad Zuse (1910-1995), German civil engineer, inventor and computer pioneer.
 Rainer Barzel (1924–2006), German politician (Christian Democratic Union).
 Hartmut Bagger (born 1938), postwar German general (Bundeswehr).
 Bartosz Białkowski (born 1987), Polish footballer (soccer player) on several British teams.
 Tomasz Ptak (born 1992), Polish footballer for Zakota Braniewo

International relations

Twin towns — sister cities
Braniewo is twinned with:
 Münster, Germany
 Nošovice, Czech Rep.

Former twin towns:
 Zelenogradsk, Russia

In March 2022, Braniewo terminated its partnership with the Russian city of Zelenogradsk as a reaction to the 2022 Russian invasion of Ukraine.

References

External links

Municipal website 
City business page 
History of Braniewo 
Local community website 
Map of Braniewo 
Street plan 
Braunsberg/Ostpreussen Kreisgemeinschaft 

Cities and towns in Warmian-Masurian Voivodeship
Braniewo County
Populated places established in the 13th century